Hofheim (officially known as Hofheim am Taunus) is the administrative centre of Main-Taunus-Kreis district, in the south of the German state of Hesse. Its population in September 2020 was 39,946.

Geography

Location
The town is located on the south side of the Taunus hills, 17 km west of Frankfurt and 17 km east of both Wiesbaden and Mainz; Frankfurt Airport is 12 km to the southeast.

Hofheim is located in the Rhine Main Area, one of the fastest-growing regions in Germany in terms of population and also in regard to economic productivity. Unemployment is the second lowest in the state of Hesse and one of the lowest in Germany.

It is mainly surrounded by forest and open country. As well as being the administrative centre of the district, Hofheim is the economic hub of the Main-Taunus-Kreis.

History

Early history

The oldest traces of human life in the area around Hofheim date back to the Palaeolithic period, with the oldest find dating back to around 40,000 B.C. From the Neolithic period from around 5000 B.C. onwards, settlement areas on the banks of the Schwarzbach, on both sides of today's Schmelzweg and on the Kapellenberg have been identified. Especially the Michelsberg culture around 4400 to 3500 B.C. is shown by numerous traces of settlements and finds on the Kapellenberg (Ringwallanlage). Around 30/40 A.D., the area was settled by the Romans, who built the Hofheim fort here as a two-phase complex - first an earth fort and from 75 A.D. under Emperor Vespasian also a stone fort, which existed until 110 A.D. - in order to secure the Wetterau region, to protect the route between Mainz and Nida in today's Frankfurt-Heddernheim, and to protect the Limes triangle, among other things. The fort was built by the Romans as a two-phase complex.

Middle ages

The first documented mention was in 1254 under the name Hoveheim, but the suffix -heim indicates a much earlier Frankish foundation. Hofheim belonged to Count Philipp VI the Elder of Falkenstein, when Emperor Charles IV on 21. This document gave the lords of Hofheim the right to build walls, gates and bridges, to erect a gallows, to hold court, to conduct crafts and to hold a market. In the imperial war against Philip the Elder of Falkenstein (Falkenstein Feud), the town was conquered by the Electorate of Mainz in 1366, to which it was subject until 1418. This was followed by the rule of the Counts of Eppstein-Königstein until the extinction of the dynasty in 1535. Within the 16th century, the owners changed only twice. From 1535 to 1574 the dominion of Eppstein-Königstein belonged to Count Ludwig von Stolberg, who introduced the Reformation in Hofheim in 1540, and from 1574 to 1581 to Christoph von Stolberg. But already in 1559 Elector and Archbishop Daniel Brendel von Homburg had redeemed an old pledge and thus regained Eppstein and Hofheim. After the death of Christoph von Stolberg, the rest of the county of Königstein also went to the Electorate of Mainz in 1581.

Under the reign of Wolfgang von Dalberg, Archbishop and Elector of Mainz, and his successor Johann Adam von Bicken, the witch trials in Electorate Mainz reached their peak in the period from 1588 to 1602 in both the Höchst and Hofheim districts. From the remains of old court records, the Aschaffenburg archive remains, 23 women could be identified who were accused of witchcraft, 15 of them found death at the stake. On November 3, 2010, the town council of Hofheim am Taunus decided to rehabilitate the citizens convicted of witchcraft.

Until the beginning of 1603, Protestantism was still the predominant religion among the inhabitants despite the town's affiliation with the Catholic Electorate of Mainz. It was not until June of that year that the Protestant pastor was replaced by a Catholic one.During the Thirty Years' War, Spanish, Bavarian, Swedish and French troops occupied, plundered and devastated the town and its present-day districts. Inhabitants were tortured into revealing the hiding places of cattle, horses and household goods. In addition to famine, epidemics broke out again and again, and in 1635 the plague spread through the region. In Hofheim, the number of men (burghers) dropped from 76 and 13 widows to 27 within four years in 1635 (no subdivision into men and widows). Finally, at the end of the Thirty Years' War in 1648, there were 40 men and 4 widows. Children, women and bystanders were not recorded in counts as a matter of principle. From 1665 on, the plague raged in Mainz and Frankfurt as well as in the region of today's Main-Taunus district. The following year Hofheim was still free of the plague and on July 3, 1666, Pastor Gleidener led the inhabitants in a procession to the "Rabberg" (today's Kapellenberg) to take a vow: If the town was spared from the plague, a chapel should be built on this spot in honor of the Blessed Virgin Mary. The chapel was built in 1667 and replaced by a successor building in 1774.

With the beginning of the French Revolution in 1789, a 26-year period of peace ended for Hofheim. The population had come to a modest prosperity and had grown to a thousand inhabitants. With the occupation of the city of Mainz by French Revolutionary troops and finally of the city of Frankfurt in 1792, Hofheim residents began years of suffering. Alternating troop marches and quarterings brought looting, famine, and epidemics.

In the Reichsdeputationshauptschluss of 1803, Hofheim fell to the principality of Nassau-Usingen. In 1806, it was united with the principality of Nassau-Weilburg. Together they formed the Duchy of Nassau. In 1866 this was annexed by Prussia and from then on existed as the province of Hesse-Nassau. After Hofheim had long been sidelined in terms of transportation, the town was connected to the railroad network from 1874 to 1877 with the construction of the Main-Lahn railroad between Frankfurt and Limburg. A renewed economic upswing began. Hofheim had also become interesting for Taunus tourists from Frankfurt thanks to the rail connection.

20th and 21st century

The First World War 1914-1918 claimed its victims: 121 men fell in acts of war. Numerous inhabitants, especially children, died as a result of malnutrition. After the armistice treaty of November 11, 1918, an occupation of Hofheim by French troops followed as early as December 2, which lasted until 1929 (officially until 1930) ( Allied occupation of the Rhineland). Hofheim was located within the thirty-kilometer radius around Mainz, which had to be cleared of German soldiers - in accordance with the victors' demands. Within these zones were the cities of Cologne and Koblenz, the area on the right bank of the Rhine, and the city of Kehl (the latter with a smaller radius).

In 1933, the National Socialists took power in Hofheim as well. In the Reichstag election on March 5, 36.91 percent of the residents in Hofheim voted for the NSDAP. In the municipal elections on March 12, 1933, the NSDAP won 6 of 12 seats. The other seats were held by the SPD (3) and the Center Party (3). On June 22, the SPD was banned, and the Center Party dissolved under massive pressure on July 5. Thus, the NSDAP was the only remaining party in Hofheim's city parliament and, as of July 24 anyway, by law the only permitted party in the German Reich. The NSDAP was the only party in Hofheim's city parliament.

By April 11, 1933, the previous mayors in 13 municipalities in the Main-Taunus district had been replaced by NSDAP members. Since 1920, Oskar Meyrer held the office of mayor in Hofheim and was to keep it until his death on August 1, 1942. After that, the position was not filled again, but continued to be held by the local group leader Georg Kaufmann on a deputy basis.

Discrimination and persecution of Communists, Social Democrats, members of the Confessing Church, and especially Jewish residents began as soon as the Nazis came to power. There had been a Jewish community since the Middle Ages. Around 1800, a synagogue had been established by the members in the former Wehrturm/Büttelturm. In 1933 the community comprised about 35 members. In the night of November 9-10, 1938 (Reichspogromnacht) this synagogue was devastated. Because of the narrow buildings in the old town, the synagogue was not set on fire. A similar fate befell the synagogue in Wallau (since 1977 a district of Hofheim). Only a few inhabitants were able to save themselves by emigrating abroad; the others were deported and were murdered in concentration camps.

On January 1, 1980, Hofheim im Taunus became the new county seat of the Main-Taunus-Kreis, but the final move did not take place until 1987 with the completion of the new county seat in Hofheim; prior to that, the administrative seat was in the Frankfurt district of Höchst, which had been part of the county as an independent town of Höchst am Main until it was incorporated into Frankfurt in 1928.

In 1988, the city of Hofheim was the 28th Hessentag city.

Between 2008 and 2014, 89 stumbling blocks for victims of National Socialism were laid in Hofheim and the districts of Marxheim, Diedenbergen, Wallau and Langenhain by the artist Gunter Demnig.

Town districts
The town's borough comprises the villages of Marxheim, Diedenbergen, Lorsbach, Langenhain (where the European Bahá'í House of Worship is located), Wallau and Wildsachsen.

Politics

Town council 
The municipal election held on 14 March 2021 yielded the following results:

Head of the town council is Andreas Hegeler (CDU).

Mayor 
Christian Vogt (CDU) was elected mayor in 2019.

District town 
The Kreishaus (district administration) of the Main-Taunus-Kreis is located in the district town Hofheim.

Public transport

The city of Frankfurt is easily accessible by public transportation through overland trains and S-Bahn line S 2 (stations in "Hofheim" and "Lorsbach" on the Main-Lahn Railway) and via the A66 motorway.

Several bus lines run from or via the central bus terminal next to the train station to the town's districts and surrounding municipalities, including Bad Homburg and Wiesbaden. Near the station stand the headquarters of the Rhine-Main Transport Association (Rhein-Main-Verkehrsverbund; RMV).

Education
Hofheim has secondary schools and several facilities for further education.

Leisure
Hofheim has numerous pubs and boasts one of the biggest swimming pools (the Rhein-Main Therme) in the Frankfurt metropolitan area. The pool is located at the northern area of the town.

Events
A highlight used to be the annual 'Waeldchestag' festival which was celebrated the week after Corpus Christi and was a local public holiday with schools being closed. The celebration involved traditional local customs. Due to several political and financial reasons the festival was abolished in 2014 and replaced with a smaller event, the "Altstadtfest" (old town fair), taking place in the core of the old town. 
 The Alois Kottmann Award for classical violin pieces in the canto-style is an international award bestowed following a competition during the International Days of Music Hesse Main-Taunus Hofheim which take place annually in May or June.
 In 1988, the town hosted the 28th Hessentag state festival.

Sights 

 The Wasserschloss (Water Castle) is located in the centre of the town. The castle was built in the 14th century and consists only of the walls today; the moat does not exist any more.
 The Kellereigebäude (Winery Building) from the 18th century neighbours the Wasserschloss. It contains the older Hexenturm (Witch Tower).
The Altes Rathaus (Old Town Hall) stands in the old main street. Having been built in the 16th century, it acquired its contemporary half timbered look by a renovation in 1900. 
St. Peter und Paul church dominates the panorama of the old town. It originated in the 15th century and passed through many changes in its design and accessories. 
The Baháì Haus der Andacht (Bahá’í House of Worship) is the European temple of the Bahá’í community and is known for its special modern design. It is located in Langenhain. 
The town museum displays permanent exhibitions about Hofheim's past as well as changing ones, which are usually related to the region. 
The Bergkapelle (Hill Chapel) looks down on Hofheim from the forest on Kapellenberg (Chapel Hill) in the northwest of the old town. It dates back to the 17th century when it was built to express relief and gratitude for having not been struck by Black Death.

Twin towns – sister cities

Hofheim is twinned with:
 Chinon, France (1967)
 Tiverton, England, United Kingdom (1980)
 Buccino, Italy (1980)
 Pruszcz Gdański, Poland (2012)

References

External links

Official homepage
 
 

Towns in Hesse
Main-Taunus-Kreis